This article lists historical political parties in Australia.

These are Australian political parties which are no longer registered with any federal, state or territory political bodies, and can thus no longer contest elections. Historical names of defunct and current parties are not included in the list as they are not separate entities.

Major parties

Federally represented

State represented

Other represented parties

Federal

State/territory only

Parties without representation

See also

 Politics of Australia
 List of political parties in Australia
 List of political parties by country

References

Australia, historical
 
Political parties, historical
Australia, historical
Political parties, historical